The laryngotracheal groove is a precursor for the larynx and trachea.

The rudiment of the respiratory organs appears as a median longitudinal groove in the ventral wall of the pharynx. The groove deepens and its lips fuse to form a septum which grows from below upward and converts the groove into a tube, the laryngotracheal tube. The cephalic end opens into the pharynx by a slit-like aperture formed by the persistent anterior part of the groove. Initially the cephalic end is in open communication with the foregut but eventually it becomes separated by indentations of mesoderm, the  tracheoesophageal folds.

When the tracheoesophageal folds fuse in the midline to form the tracheoesophageal septum, the foregut is divided into trachea ventrally and the esophagus dorsally. The tube is lined by endoderm from which the epithelial lining of the respiratory tract is developed. The cephalic part of the tube becomes the larynx, and its next succeeding part the trachea, while from its caudal end a respiratory diverticulum appears as the lung bud. The lung bud branches into two lateral outgrowths known as the bronchial buds, one on each side of the trachea. The right and left bronchial buds branch into main (primary), lobar (secondary), segmental (tertiary), and subsegmental bronchi and lead to the development of the lungs. The Hox complex, FGF-10 (fibroblast growth factor), BMP-4 (bone morphogenetic protein), N-myc (a proto-oncogene), syndecan (a proteglycan), tenascin (an extracellular matrix protein) and epimorphin (a protein) appear to play a role in development of the respiratory system.

References

External links
 http://www.uoguelph.ca/zoology/devobio/210labs/lung1.html
 https://web.archive.org/web/20071013195736/http://embryology.med.unsw.edu.au/Notes/respire.htm

Animal developmental biology
Embryology
Human head and neck